Lake Hāmūn (Daryācheh-ye Hāmūn), or the Hamoun Oasis, is a seasonal lake and wetlands in the endorheic Sīstān Basin in the Sistan region on the Afghanistan–Iran border. In Iran, it is also known as Hāmūn-e Helmand, Hāmūn-e Hīrmand, or Daryācheh-ye Sīstān ("Lake Sīstān").

Hāmūn is a generic term which refers to shallow lakes (or lagoons), usually seasonal, that occur in the deserts of southeast Iran and adjacent areas of Afghanistan and Pakistan as a product of snowmelt in nearby mountains in spring. The term Hāmūn Lake (or Lake Hāmūn) is equally applied to Hāmūn-e Helmand (entirely in Iran), as well to the shallow lakes Hāmūn-e Sabari and Hāmūn-e Puzak, which extend into the territory of present-day Afghanistan with latter being almost entirely inside Afghanistan.

The Hamun is fed by numerous seasonal water tributaries; the main tributary is the perennial Helmand River, which originates in the Hindu Kush mountains in Afghanistan. In modern times, and prior to the existence of the dams for agricultural irrigation, spring floods would bring into existence much larger lakes.

Geography
It is located located in Pakistan on the Sīstān marshes west of the Dasht-e Mārgow desert where the Helmand River forms a dendritic delta. Water flows in a circular fashion through a string of lakes starting with Hāmūn-e Puzak in the northeast, sweeping into Hāmūn-e Sabari and finally overflows into Hāmūn-e Helmand in the southwest.

The area was thriving with wildlife animals and migratory birds.

A trapezoid-shaped basalt outcropping, known as Mount Khajeh, rises up as an island in the middle of which used to be Hāmūn Lake and the northeastern edge of Hāmūn-e Helmand.

Hamun Lake is sometimes categorized as three sibling shallow lakes Hamun-e Helmand, Hāmūn-e Sabari and Hāmūn-e Puzak, the latter extending into the Lash wa Juwayn District of Farah Province in Afghanistan.

Lake Hāmūn is fed primarily by water catchments on the Afghani side, including the Harut River. It is in the Sistan region and it is in the Lash wa Juvayn District of the Farah Province of Afghanistan. The Harut River flows into the lake on the Afghanistan side of the border. In 1976, when rivers in Afghanistan were flowing regularly, the amount of water in the lake was relatively high. Between 1999 and 2001, however, the lake all but dried up and disappeared, as can be seen in the 2001 satellite image.

When droughts occur in Afghanistan, or the water in watersheds that support Lake Hāmūn is drawn down by other natural or human-induced reasons, the result is a dry lake bed in Iran. In addition, when the lake is dry, seasonal winds blow fine sands off the exposed lake bed. The sand is swirled into huge dunes that may cover a hundred or more fishing villages along the former lakeshore. Wildlife around the lake is negatively impacted and fisheries are brought to a halt. Changes in water policies and substantial rains in the region hope to effect a return of much of the water in Lake Hamoun by 2003.

In 1975 the hāmūn, together with Hāmūn-e Sabari, was designated a Ramsar site.

History

Archeological sites
The area has important archeological remains. The giant prehistoric city of Shahr-i-Sokhta is located in the area. Also the ruins of an ancient Achaemenid city Dahan-e Gholaman (“Gate of Slaves”) are near the Hāmūn Lake. Shahr-i-Sokhta is located about 35km southwest of Dahan-e Gholaman.

In 1975 the Hāmūn-e Helmand, together with Hāmūn-e Sabari, was designated a Ramsar site.

Irrigation
In the past five millennia, people around Hamoun Oasis, for the most part, lived in harmony with the wetlands and their wildlife. Specific culture formed around the Hamoun with a way of life suited to the desert wetlands. They fashioned long reed boats to navigate the shallow waters and erected squat, red clay houses to withstand the heat of the desert. Their livelihood was based almost entirely on hunting, fishing, and farming.
Until the late 20th century, irrigation waxed and waned in the Sīstān Basin for over 4,000 years without destroying the wetlands, but then population rapidly increased and new water management technologies were brought to the region. Soon irrigation schemes began to snake their way throughout the basin. Farther west, revolving Afghan governments constructed large dams (Arghandab Dam, Kajaki Dam) that diverted water from the upper reaches of the river.

Devastation by extreme droughts in 1999-2001
Precipitation variability in the Hindu Kush results in alternating periods of flooding in the Helmand and droughts, which may cause entire lagoons to dry up. This occurred several times in the 20th century when only the uppermost of the lakes remained flooded.  Landsat satellite imagery show how dramatic decrease in precipitation resulted in decrease of snow-covered area in the Helmand Basin, from 41,000 km2 in 1998 to 26,000 km2 in 2000. By 2001, Iran and Afghanistan were experienced for the third consecutive year an extreme drought that was so severe that the Hamoun dried out completely.

Sīstān's population, swelled by refugees from war-torn Afghanistan, has been severely affected by water shortages. Irrigation channels have run dry and agriculture has come to a standstill, which has resulted in the abandonment of many villages as people migrate in search of water.

Combination of drought and the massive irrigation proved to be a shock to the wetlands. Within five years period (1998-2002) once fertile wetlands rapidly deteriorated. We could reasonably presume that transformation of Hamoun into arid country, like their surrounding areas, was mainly caused by irrigated agriculture expansion since the 1970s (represent as bright red patches on satellite images, mainly wheat and barley), coupled with one of the worst droughts ever witnessed in Central Asia in 1999-2001 period.
The wetlands have been replaced mostly by lifeless salt flats and decaying reed stands. The wildlife, the towns, the fisheries, and the agriculture that once surrounded the Hamoun have all fallen away, giving rise to a wasteland.

Winds that were once cooled by the waters of the wetlands now drifting dust, sand, and salt from the dried lakebeds onto the surrounding villages, and these sand drifts have submerged nearly 100 villages beneath dunes in a landscape reminiscent of the Aral Sea disaster. Most of the crops have been reduced to dust bowl conditions, livestock herds have been decimated, and thriving fishery with an annual catch of around 12,000 tons has been wiped out. Many who had lived around the Hamoun for generations either moved away or lost everything.

Local bird population disappeared and migratory birds no longer stop for lack of refuge, and wildlife that could not sustain themselves in the desert or make the long journey to another oasis died.  The rest of the wetlands now give off the harsh glare of dried salt flats. The only relatively large bodies of standing water are Chāh-Nīmeh IV reservoir maintained for drinking water.

See also

 Sīstān Basin
 Helmand River
 Mount Khajeh
 Arachosia
 Drangiana
 Sistan

Notes

References

External links

Endorheic lakes of Asia
Hamun, Lake
Hamun, Lake
Helmand River drainage basin
Helmand River
Wetlands of Afghanistan
Wetlands of Iran
Archaeological sites in Iran
Ramsar sites in Iran
Landforms of Farah Province
Landforms of Nimruz Province
Landforms of Kandahar Province
Landforms of Sistan and Baluchestan Province
Landforms of Zabul Province
Biosphere reserves of Iran
Sistan